The 1931 Duke Blue Devils football team was an American football team that represented Duke University during the 1931 Southern Conference football season. In its first season under head coach Wallace Wade, the team compiled a 5–3–2 record (3–3–1 against conference opponents), shut out seven opponents, and outscored all opponents by a total of 74 to 46. Kidd Brewer was the team captain. The team played its home games at Duke Stadium in Durham, North Carolina.

Schedule

References

Duke
Duke Blue Devils football seasons
Duke Blue Devils football